The 12913 / 12914 Indore–Nagpur Tri Shatabdi Express is a weekly Superfast Express train of the Indian Railways, which runs between  and .

Coach composition

The train consists of 22 coaches:

 1 AC II Tier
 4 AC III Tier
 11 Sleeper class
 4 General Unreserved
 2 End-on-Generator

Service

12913/Indore–Nagpur Tri Shatabdi Express has an average speed of 55 km/hr and covers 653.2 km in 11 hrs 50 mins.
12914/Nagpur–Indore Tri Shatabdi Express has an average speed of 55 km/hr and covers 653.2 km in 11 hrs 50 mins.

Route & halts

The important halts of the train are:

Schedule

Rake sharing

The train shares its rake with 19311/19312 Indore–Pune Express (via Panvel).

Direction reversal

Train reverses its direction at:

Traction

Both trains are hauled by a Vadodara-based WAP-7 (HOG)-equipped electric locomotive from end to end.

See also

 Ahilyanagari Express

References

Express trains in India
Transport in Indore
Transport in Nagpur
Railway services introduced in 2003
Rail transport in Madhya Pradesh
Rail transport in Maharashtra
Named passenger trains of India